Agostino Campanella (active 1770) was an Italian painter and engraver. He was born in Florence. He engraved several prints representing historical and biblical subjects.

References

18th-century Italian painters
Italian male painters
Italian engravers
Painters from Florence
Year of birth unknown
Year of death unknown
18th-century Italian male artists